The 2017 Shippensburg Raiders football team was an American football team that represented Shippensburg University in the Pennsylvania State Athletic Conference (PSAC) during the 2017 NCAA Division II football season.  Led by seventh-year head coach Mark Maciejewski, the Raiders compiled a 10–1 record and tied for the East Division championship. Both of the team's losses were to West Chester, first in the regular season and later in the Division II playoffs. The team played its home games at Seth Grove Stadium in Shippensburg, Pennsylvania.

After the season, Maciejewski was named the 2017 AFCA Division II Region 1 Coach of the Year. Seven Shippensburg players were selected as first-team players on the All-PSAC East football team: quarterback Ryan Zapoticky; wide receiver Winston Eubanks; defensive linemen Richard Nase and Dakota Thompson; linebacker Tyler Emge; and defensive backs Richard Sheler and Kevin Taylor.

Schedule

References

Shippensburg
Shippensburg Red Raiders football seasons
Shippensburg Raiders football